Livin' for the Weekend: The Anthology is a compilation album by the Canadian hard rock band Triumph. The most comprehensive Triumph anthology ever issued at the time of its 2005 release, this two-CD set draws material from most of the albums the band had issued, as well as adding a previously unreleased cover of "Love Hurts" and two live tracks: "Spellbound" from their 1985 release Stages and "Never Surrender" from their 1983 appearance at the US Festival that was released in 2003 on Live at the US Festival.

Tracks

Disc one
 "24 Hours a Day" – 4:25
 "Street Fighter" – 6:30
 "Blinding Light Show"/"Moonchild" – 8:41
 "Takes Time" – 3:47
 "Medley: New York City Streets, Pt. 1/ Pt. 2" – 7:51
 "Rocky Mountain Way" (Barnstorm cover) – 4:06
 "Lay It on the Line" – 4:04
 "Hold On" – 6:03
 "I Live for the Weekend" – 5:17
 "I Can Survive" – 3:59
 "Fool for Your Love" – 4:29
 "Allied Forces" – 5:05
 "Fight the Good Fight" – 6:30

Disc two
 "Magic Power" – 4:54
 "Too Much Thinking" – 5:38
 "When the Lights Go Down" – 5:05
 "Follow Your Heart" – 3:34
 "Spellbound [live]" – 3:57
 "Mind Games" – 4:47
 "Tears in the Rain" – 3:54
 "Somebody's Out There" – 4:05
 "Just One Night" – 3:40
 "Never Say Never" – 3:37
 "Headed for Nowhere" – 6:07
 "Carry on the Flame" – 5:15
 "Long Time Gone" – 5:14
 "Never Surrender [live]" – 6:38
 "Love Hurts" (The Everly Brothers cover) – 4:38

Personnel
 Rik Emmett – guitar, vocals
 Gil Moore – drums, percussion, vocals
 Michael Levine – bass guitar, keyboards, synthesizers

Triumph (band) albums
Albums produced by Mike Levine (musician)
2005 live albums
2005 compilation albums